Rebirth is the second album by the Swedish industrial metal project Pain. It was released in 1999 via the Swedish label Stockholm Records. It was on this album, that the band's electronic sound first appeared. It includes the band's first two singles to make the Swedish single charts: "End of the Line", which peaked at No. 15, and "On and On", which peaked at No. 30. Powered by the popularity of "End of the Line" ("On and On" was not released as a single until eight months later), the album hit No. 21 on the Swedish album charts.

Track listing
All songs written by Peter Tägtgren.

"Supersonic Bitch" – 3:44
"End of the Line" – 4:03
"Breathing In Breathing Out" – 3:35
"Delusions" – 4:03
"Suicide Machine" – 4:16
"Parallel to Ecstasy" – 3:58
"On and On" – 3:55
"12:42" – 1:52
"Crashed" – 4:01
"Dark Fields of Pain" – 5:00
"She Whipped" – 4:49

References

1999 albums
Pain (musical project) albums
Stockholm Records albums
Albums produced by Peter Tägtgren